Fort Wayne Park and Boulevard System Historic District is a national historic district located at Fort Wayne, Indiana.  The district encompasses 34 contributing buildings, 61 contributing sites, 70 contributing structures, and 15 contributing objects in 11 public parks, four parkways, and ten boulevards associated with the parkway and boulevard system in Fort Wayne. The system was originally conceived in 1909 by Charles Mulford Robinson (1869–1917) and further developed and refined by noted landscape architect and planner George Kessler (1862-1923) in 1911–1912.  The buildings reflect Classical Revival and Bungalow / American Craftsman style architecture.  Later additions and modifications include those by noted landscape architect Arthur Asahel Shurcliff.

It was listed on the National Register of Historic Places in 2010.

References

External links

Historic districts on the National Register of Historic Places in Indiana
Neoclassical architecture in Indiana
Buildings and structures in Fort Wayne, Indiana
National Register of Historic Places in Fort Wayne, Indiana
1909 establishments in Indiana